Peter Nilsson may refer to:

 Peter Nilsson (ice hockey) (born 1962), Swedish ice hockey player
 Peter Nilsson (footballer, born 1958), Swedish football midfielder
 Peter Nilsson (footballer, born 1974), Swedish football forward

See also
Peter Nilson (1937–1998), Swedish astronomer and novelist